General elections are expected to be held in Zimbabwe in July or August 2023.

Electoral system
The President of Zimbabwe is elected using the two-round system.

The 270 members of the National Assembly consist of 210 members elected in single-member constituencies and 60 women elected by proportional representation in ten six-seat constituencies based on the country's provinces. Voters cast a single vote, which is counted for both forms of election. The 80 members of the Senate include 60 members elected from ten six-member constituencies (also based on the provinces) by proportional representation using party lists; the lists must have a woman at the top and alternate between men and women. The other 20 seats include two reserved for people with disabilities and 18 for traditional chiefs.

References

Zimbabwe
Presidential elections in Zimbabwe
Elections in Zimbabwe
General